TRZ may refer to:
 Transitional Rainfall Zone
 TransMeridian Airlines
 Trizec Properties
 Tiruchirappalli International Airport